Robert Frye (died 1435), from Wiltshire, was an English Member of Parliament and civil servant.

Family
Frye was the son of Agnes Frye and an unknown father. Her second marriage was to Thomas Raleigh of Farnborough, Warwickshire, who died in 1397. In 1399, she married Thomas Wanklyn.

Frye was the stepbrother of Thomas Raleigh, who was a Member of Parliament for Warwickshire.

Career
He was a Member (MP) of the Parliament of England for Shaftesbury in 1406 and 1417 and for Wilton in 1406, 1407, 1410, 1411 and May 1413.

References

14th-century births
1435 deaths
English MPs 1406
People from Wiltshire
English MPs 1417
English MPs 1407
English MPs 1410
English MPs 1411
English MPs May 1413